William Mather Swinden (1886-1964), was a male English international badminton player.

Badminton career
Swinden born in Cheshire  was a winner of the 1923 Scottish Open and runner-up in the All England Open Badminton Championships.

He was part of the English team that toured Canada in 1925 to promote the sport on behalf of the Canadian Badminton Association which had recently been formed in 1921.

References

English male badminton players
1886 births
1964 deaths